Little Stranger, Inc. is a film and television production company founded by actress and producer Tina Fey with president and long-time collaborator Eric Gurian. It is known for producing the long-running series 30 Rock and Unbreakable Kimmy Schmidt. The company's name is a rough translation of Xenakes, Fey's mother's maiden name.

Production
In February 2016, Little Stranger signed with Universal Pictures on a two-year first look production deal.

Filmography

Film
 Sisters (with Everyman Pictures) (2015)
 The Kicker (with 3 Arts Entertainment) (TBA)
 Whiskey Tango Foxtrot (with Broadway Video) (2016)
 Do Nothing Bitches (TBA)
 The Sackett Sisters (TBA)
 Mail-Order Groom (TBA)
 Fancy Nancy (TBA)
 Mean Girls: The Musical (with Broadway Video) (TBA)

Television
 30 Rock (with Broadway Video and Universal Television) (2006–2013)
 Unbreakable Kimmy Schmidt (with Bevel Gears, 3 Arts Entertainment and Universal Television) (2015–2019)
 Great News (with 3 Arts Entertainment and Universal Television) (2017–2018)
 Busy Tonight (with Busy Bee Productions and Wilshire Studios) (2018–2019)
 Mr. Mayor (with 3 Arts Entertainment and Universal Television) (2021–2022)
 Girls5eva (with Bevel Gears, 3 Arts Entertainment and Universal Television) (2021–present)

References

Mass media companies established in 2001
Film production companies of the United States
Television production companies of the United States